Manavudu Danavudu is a 1972 Indian Telugu-language film directed by P. Chandrasekhara Reddy. The film stars Sobhan Babu, Sarada and Krishna Kumari. It was produced by P. Chinnapa Reddy of Ushasri Films.

Sobhan Babu played a dual role as Doctor Venu during the daytime and as Killer Jagan during the nighttime. The film was remade in Hindi by Doondi as Adha Din Adhi Raat (1977) and in Tamil as Engal Thanga Raja (1973) and in Malayalam as Ithaanente Vazhi (1978).

Cast 
Sobhan Babu as  Dr. Venu and Jagan (dual role)
 Sarada as Radha Devi
 Krishnam Raju (Cameo) as Inspector
 Krishna Kumari as Seeta
Kaikala Satyanarayana as Bhujangam
Raja Babu
Mukkamala
P. J. Sarma as Narayana

Soundtrack 
 "Ammalaanti Chalanadi Lokam Okate Undile"
 "Anuvu Anuvuna Velasina Deva Kanuvelugai Mamu Nadipimpa Rava" (Lyrics: C. Narayana Reddy; Singers: S. P. Balasubrahmanyam)
 "Kanche Kaada Manche Kaada" (Lyrics: C. Narayana Reddy; Singer: L. R. Eswari)
 "Koppu Choodu"
 "Pachani Mana Kapuram Pala Velugai" (Singer: P. Susheela)
 "Yevaaru Veeru"

Box office 
The film ran for more than 100 days in 6 centres in Andhra Pradesh.

References

External links 
 

1972 films
1970s Telugu-language films
Telugu films remade in other languages
Films directed by P. Chandrasekhara Reddy